Barefoot Sultan (Spanish:El sultán descalzo) is a 1956 Mexican comedy film directed by Gilberto Martínez Solares and starring Germán Valdés, Yolanda Varela and Óscar Pulido.

Main cast
 Germán Valdés as Sultán Casquillo  
 Yolanda Varela as Cristina Mena  
 Óscar Pulido as Tomás  
 Wolf Ruvinskis as Hilario  
 Joaquín García Vargas as Don Venustiano  
 Liliana Durán as Pancha  
 Marcelo Chávez as Comisario  
 Elmo Michel as Doctor  
 Florencio Castelló as Don Pacorro  
 José Jasso as Productor  
 Agata Rosenow  as Aidita  
 Óscar Ortiz de Pinedo as Maestro de baile  
 Silvia Carrillo as Bailarina  
 Martinique as Bailarina negra

References

Bibliography 
 Carlos Monsiváis & John Kraniauskas. Mexican Postcards. Verso, 1997.

External links 
 

1956 films
1956 comedy films
Mexican comedy films
1950s Spanish-language films
Films directed by Gilberto Martínez Solares
1950s Mexican films
Mexican black-and-white films